The Austin Apache is a small family car that was produced by Leykor between November 1971 and 1978. The Apache was the last BMC ADO16 car to be produced. The Spanish manufacturer Authi also built a version of the car, called the Austin Victoria, at its Pamplona plant between 1972 and 1975.

History 
The car was styled by Michelotti, and based on the chassis and various other components of the Austin/Morris 1100. Leykor executives saw Michelotti's prototype in England and chose it for production in South Africa, where ADO16 sales had been dropping. While the car's centre structure was that of the Austin/Morris 1100, its front and rear styling was all-new, styled (particularly at the rear, where the boot was a notchback) to resemble a scaled-down Triumph 2000/2500. The tail lights, and outer sections of the rear bumper were the same as those used by the Triumph 2000/2500. See also the more comparably sized Triumph Dolomite and Triumph Toledo.

In 1973 the Apache received a minor facelift, introducing proper CV joints, round Smiths gauges and a rod linkage for the gear shift. Originally, the ADO16 used rubber drive joints, a strip speedometer, and a remote extension gear lever. Also in 1973, the sporty TC model was added to the lineup. The TC also received Rostyle rims, vinyl roof, a rev counter, and a sporty steering wheel. All versions of the Apache and Victoria used the 1,275 cc version of BMC's venerable A-series four-cylinder, with a variety of outputs.

Production

References and links

 http://www.authi.net Website of Authi enthusiasts (in Spanish)
 Austin Victoria page at AR on-line

Apache
Front-wheel-drive vehicles
Mid-size cars
Cars introduced in 1971